Anna Prelević (born 28 April 1990 in Belgrade, SFR Yugoslavia) is a Serbian-Greek model, TV presenter and entrepreneur. In 2010, Prelevic was crowned Star Hellas. She is daughter of the former basketball player Branislav Prelević.

Life 
Prelevic was born on 28 April 1990 to former basketball player Branislav Prelević and Nevena Prelević-Marjanović, daughter of Serbian singer Đorđe Marjanović. She has a younger sister, Tea Prelevic (born 1992).  She was born in Belgrade but grew up in Thessaloniki. In 1996, when her father signed with Virtus Bologna, they moved to Bologna but after one season, her father signed a contract with AEK BC and so they moved to Athens, Greece. Although her father left the club after two seasons and played again for PAOK BC, she spent the next years of her life in Athens.  At the age of 18, Prelevic moved to UK to study Media Communication at the Goldsmiths, University of London. After three years she graduated in 2010 and moved back to Greece. She participated in the election for Miss Greece and she was elected Miss Greece 2010 and so she represented Greece at the Miss Universe 2010.  Anna speaks five languages: Greek, Serbian, English, Italian and Russian.

Personal life
From 2014 to 2016, Prelevic had been in a relationship with Greek singer Giorgos Sabanis. In 2017, Prelevic began dating Greek basketball player Ioannis Papapetrou but they split three years later.  Since 2020, Prelevic has been in a relationship with Nikitas Nomikos, who is Doukissa Nomikou's brother.

Filmography

References

1990 births
Living people
Models from Belgrade
Models from Thessaloniki
Serbian female models
Greek female models
Greek people of Serbian descent
Miss Universe 2010 contestants